Albert Alden may refer to:
 Albert Alden (cyclist) (1887–1965), British cyclist
 Albert Alden (politician) (1813–1892), American politician